Helli Louise Brunchmann Jacobson, often billed as Helli Louise (2 August 1949 – 22 June 2018), was a Danish born actress who appeared in British films and television, including The Benny Hill Show, during the 1970s.

Career
Jacobson was born on 2 August 1949 in Copenhagen, Denmark. She moved to the United Kingdom in the early 1970s, studying at the London Film School  1971, and developing a curious Copenhagen/Cockney accent along the way. Represented by Barrie Stacey Promotions during her British acting career, she appeared in John Jesnor Lindsay's film The Hot Girls (1974), a fake exposé of the modelling world. More mainstream work included guest appearances in The Sweeney and The Goodies, and roles in Carry On Behind (1975) and several other British sex comedies. Jacobson was also active on stage appearing in a touring production of Hair in 1974, and in the stage farce Pyjama Tops ( 1973) where co-stars included Fiona Richmond, Jess Conrad and Lucienne Camille.

Aside from her acting career Jacobson was also the managing director of a clothing firm, and worked in the music industry managing a band called Ix. After a role in 1979's The World Is Full of Married Men, she left acting to pursue work in the music industry full-time, and then worked for Harvey Goldsmith.

Filmography
The Daughter: I, a Woman Part III (1970) - Patient
Daddy, Darling (1970) - Katja
Nana (1970) - Simone
24 hours with Ilse (1971) - herself (documentary)
Christa (1971) - Inge (uncredited)
Dagmar's Hot Pants, Inc. (1971) - Dagmar's girlfriend Britta
Soft Beds, Hard Battles (1973) - Prostitute (uncredited)
The Hot Girls (1974, short) - Helli, lesbian scene
Confessions of a Pop Performer (1975) - Eva
Carry On Behind (1975) - Stripper
The Ups and Downs of a Handyman (1976) - Newsagent's daughter
Hardcore (1977) - Third 'Men Only' Girl (uncredited)
The World Is Full of Married Men (1979) - Paul's backing group

TV films
Udsigt til garden og gaden (1970) - Susanne, datteren
Lille dosis strindberg (1970) - Martha Magdalene
The Goodies and the Beanstalk (1973) - Girl with the Puppies

TV appearances
Salto Mortale – "Helli Louise Brunchmann" in the episode "Gastspiel in Kopenhagen" (1971)
The Benny Hill Show – various roles in the episode "Jackie Wright's Holiday" (1973)
Up Sunday - in the episode? (197?)
The Goodies - Girl with the Puppies in "The Goodies and the Beanstalk (1973), Eskimo Nell in the episode "Winter Olympics" (1973), and Dana in the episode "The Race" (1974)
Love Thy Neighbour, Angie - in episodes No. 4.4 (1974) and No. 5.3 (1975)
The Sweeney - 2nd girl in pub in the episode "Golden Boy" (1975)

Stage plays
Pyjama Tops (1973?) – Claudine Amour
The Empire Builders (197?)
The Marriage-Go-Round (197?)
The Bed (197?)
The Informer (197?)
Hair (1974) – Tribe member

External sources
Keeping the British End Up: Four Decades of Saucy Cinema by Simon Sheridan (Titan Books) (4th edition) 2011
Titbits magazine No. 4721, September 9–15, 1976 – Helli's Biggest Sin by Douglas Marlborough

References

External links

1949 births
2018 deaths
Actresses from Copenhagen
Danish emigrants to England
Danish film actresses